Bloodywood is an Indian heavy metal band from New Delhi, formed in 2016. They began as a parody band that uploaded metal covers of pop songs on YouTube, but later went on to write their own original material. The band has cited Linkin Park, Rage Against the Machine, System of a Down, Alter Bridge, and Limp Bizkit as their musical influences.

History
Prior to forming the band, Karan Katiyar would regularly upload parody metal covers of popular Bollywood songs on YouTube, but he had trouble finding a suitable vocalist. At a local gig, Katiyar met Jayant Bhadula, who worked as a talent manager at an entertainment company, and was impressed by his vocal range and versatility.

In 2016, Katiyar quit his job as a corporate lawyer and together with Bhadula formed a two-piece band with the intention of "destroying pop songs".

In 2017, Bloodywood re-recorded Linkin Park's song "Heavy" in Linkin Park's early nu metal style, catching the attention of many music websites such as Loudwire and Metal Hammer, the latter of which declared it "what Linkin Park's Heavy should have sounded like." The band made more covers in 2017 and released the compilation cover album Anti-Pop Vol. 1 on their Bandcamp page. This was followed by a metal cover version of the popular Bhangra/Indi-pop song "Tunak Tunak Tun" by Daler Mehndi, featuring guest vocals from Bonde do Metaleiro.

In 2018, Bloodywood released "Ari Ari", a cover of the Bhangra song "Ari Ari" by the duo Bombay Rockers, which itself was a version of the Indian folk song "Baari Barsi". The track featured rapper Raoul Kerr, whom Katiyar had invited to take part after working on a lyric video for him. The song's initial exposure was provided by Bollywood actress Ileana D'Cruz, who shared the video of "Ari Ari" on her social media. The positive reception from fans encouraged the band to write original material and draw more inspiration from Indian folk music.

In July of the same year, Bloodywood partnered with online counselling site HopeTherapy and released the song "Jee Veerey", dedicated to fighting depression and mental illness. On 15 January 2019, the band released "Endurant", a song dealing with the topic of bullying.

On 21 April 2019, it was announced that Bloodywood would be performing at Wacken Open Air. Two days later, the band released the song "Machi Bhasad (Expect a Riot)", initially intended for the upcoming Ubisoft game Beyond Good and Evil 2, as well as announcing that Kerr is becoming a permanent member of the band and that Bloodywood is embarking on their "Raj Against the Machine Tour".

In 2021, Bloodywood was named one of the "12 new metal bands to watch in 2022" by the heavy metal and rock music magazine Metal Hammer. They were also nominated  for the Breakthrough Asian Band title at the 2021 Global Metal Apocalypse awards, finishing second.

Bloodywood's debut studio album of original material is titled Rakshak and was released on 18 February 2022.

Social work
Along with the messages included in their songs, the band aims to support various social/charity causes. With the release of the video for their song "Jee Veerey", they gave away pre-paid online counselling sessions.

Upon returning to India from their 2019 European tour, Bloodywood donated the earnings to Posh Foundation, a local NGO that cares for homeless animals, for the purchase of a new ambulance.

Band members
 Karan Katiyar – guitars, flute, production, composition
 Jayant Bhadula – vocals, growls
 Raoul Kerr – rap vocals

Touring members
 Sarthak Pahwa – dhol
 Roshan Roy – bass
 Vishesh Singh – drums

Discography

Studio albums
 Anti-Pop Vol. 1 (2017)
 Rakshak (2022)

Singles
 "Angry Santa" (2017)
 "Tunak Tunak Metal" (feat. Bonde do Metaleiro; 2018)
 "Rang Basanti" (2018)
 "Ari Ari" (2018)
 "Jee Veerey" (2018)
 "Endurant" (2019)
 "Machi Bhasad" (2019)
 "Yaad" (2020)
 "Great Is Born Raw" (with The Snake Charmer; 2021)
 "Gaddaar" (2021)
 "Aaj" (2022)
 "Dana Dan" (2022)

Videos
 "Angry Santa" (2017)
 "Tunak Tunak Tun" (feat. Bonde do Metaleiro; 2018)
 "Rang De Basanti" (2018)
 "Ari Ari" (2018)
 "Jee Veerey" (2018)
 "Endurant" (2019)
 "Machi Bhasad" (2019)
 "Yaad" (2020)
 "Gaddaar" (2021)
 "Aaj" (2022)
 "Dana Dan" (2022)

References

External links
 
 Bandcamp page

2016 establishments in Delhi
Cover bands
Indian folk metal musical groups
Musical groups established in 2016
Nu metal musical groups
Indian heavy metal musical groups